KXFG (92.9 FM) is a commercial country music radio station in Menifee, California, broadcasting to the south-western sections of the Riverside-San Bernardino, California, area.  KXFG is a simulcast of KFRG in San Bernardino, California.  Its studios are in Colton and the transmitter site for KXFG is in Murrieta.

KXFG broadcasts and HD Radio signal.

On August 17, 2006, KFRG became the only country radio station that could be heard in the Los Angeles area by default, as KZLA changed its programming format to rhythmic adult contemporary, until October 28, 2006, when KKGO changed its programming format from adult standards to country to fill void in the Los Angeles area.

KFRG had been focusing more on Orange County and Los Angeles area news and traffic since the demise of KZLA, but on February 23, 2007, KKGO moved its Country format and call letters to its FM sister station, thus bringing a full-powered FM Country music station back the nation's second largest radio market after a six-month absence.

In October 2006, KFRG added the syndicated overnight program, After Midnite, from Premiere Radio Networks which is hosted by Blair Garner.

On February 2, 2017, CBS Radio announced it would merge with Entercom. The merger was approved on November 9, 2017, and was consummated on the 17th.

Lake Elsinore Storm Baseball Games
During Lake Elsinore Storm baseball games, KXFG formerly interrupted the KFRG simulcast to carry the team's play-by-play.  It replaced XEPE-AM in 2009. , Lake Elsinore Storm Baseball games have moved to KMYT.

References

External links
 
 

XFG
Country radio stations in the United States
Audacy, Inc. radio stations
Radio stations established in 1997
1997 establishments in California